Burundi competed at the 2020 Summer Olympics in Tokyo. Originally scheduled to take place from 24 July to 9 August 2020, the Games were postponed to 23 July to 8 August 2021, because of the COVID-19 pandemic. It was the nation's seventh consecutive appearance at the Summer Olympics.

Competitors
The following is the list of number of competitors in the Games.

Athletics

Burundian athletes achieved the entry standards, either by qualifying time or by world ranking, in the following track and field events (up to a maximum of 3 athletes in each event):

Track & road events

Boxing

Burundi received an invitation from the Tripartite Commission to send the women's flyweight boxer Ornella Havyarimana to the Olympics, marking the country's debut in the sport.

Swimming

Burundi received a universality invitation from FINA to send two top-ranked swimmers (one per gender) in their respective individual events to the Olympics, based on the FINA Points System of June 28, 2021.

References

External links
 Burundi at the 2020 Summer Olympics at Olympedia

Nations at the 2020 Summer Olympics
2020
2021 in Burundian sport